Denis Mikhaylovich Kniga (born 14 April 1992) is a Russian professional football player.

Career
He made his Russian Football National League debut for FC Luch-Energiya Vladivostok on 27 May 2012 in a game against FC Fakel Voronezh.

In April 2019, Kniga moved to Mongolia and joined Deren FC in the Mongolian National Premier League.

References

External links
 Career summary at sportbox.ru
 

1992 births
People from Primorsky Krai
Living people
Russian footballers
FC Luch Vladivostok players
FC Rotor Volgograd players
FC Dynamo Saint Petersburg players
FC Tosno players
Riga FC players
Russian expatriate footballers
Expatriate footballers in Latvia
Association football goalkeepers
FC Neftekhimik Nizhnekamsk players
FC Khimki players
FC Kolkheti-1913 Poti players
Expatriate footballers in Georgia (country)
FC Dynamo Bryansk players
FC Dynamo Stavropol players
Sportspeople from Primorsky Krai